Leptodactylus silvanimbus is a species of frog in the family Leptodactylidae. 
It is endemic to Honduras found in the region of El Chaguiton, Ocotepeque. This region is located at 1870 meters, making this species the only one in its genus to live at such high elevation.
Its natural habitats are subtropical or tropical moist montane forests, intermittent rivers, pastureland, and ponds. 
It is threatened by habitat loss.

References

silvanimbus
Endemic fauna of Honduras
Amphibians of Honduras
Frogs of North America
Critically endangered fauna of North America
Amphibians described in 1980
Taxonomy articles created by Polbot